The Journalist's Resource is a website that aims to connect journalists with information about recently published academic studies. A project of the Shorenstein Center on Media, Politics and Public Policy at Harvard Kennedy School, the website features summaries of academic studies written in a journalistic, story-centered style. It was launched in 2010, originally to make it easier for journalism professors to teach about reporting on academic studies, and was redesigned in 2011. It is operated by faculty, staff, and graduate students through the Carnegie-Knight Initiative, a partnership between the Carnegie Corporation of New York and the John S. and James L. Knight Foundation.

References

External links

Internet properties established in 2010
American science websites
Harvard Kennedy School
Harvard University publications